Lucas Walshaw (born 4 August 1992) is an English professional rugby league footballer who plays for the Batley Bulldogs in the Betfred Championship, as a  or .

He previously played for the Wakefield Trinity Wildcats in the Super League, and spent time on loan from the Wakefield Trinity Wildcats at Doncaster in 2012 Championship 1, and the Dewsbury Rams in the Championship. Walshaw also played for the Bradford Bulls in the Championship, and spent time on loan from Bradford Bulls at Dewsbury Rams in the second tier. He later joined the Dewsbury Rams on a permanent deal.

Bradford Bulls

2015
Walshaw signed for Bradford on a 2-year deal. He featured in the pre-season friendlies against the Castleford Tigers and Leeds Rhinos.

He featured between round 1 (Leigh Centurions) and round 5 (Batley Bulldogs) then in round 8 (Dewsbury Rams). He played in round 21 (Sheffield Eagles), round 22 and round 23 (Halifax). He also featured in the Challenge Cup in round 4 (Workington Town) and round 5 (Hull Kingston Rovers). He scored a try against the Hull Kingston Rovers.

2016
Walshaw featured in the pre-season friendlies against Leeds Rhinos and Castleford Tigers.

He featured in round 5 (Oldham) and round 16 (Dewsbury Rams). Walshaw also played in round 18 (Batley Bulldogs).

Dewsbury Rams
Walshaw signed with Dewsbury Rams in September 2016.

Statistics
Statistics do not include pre-season friendlies.

References

External links
Dewsbury Rams profile 
 (archived by web.archive.org) Profile at wakefieldwildcats.co.uk
Search for "Lucas Walshaw" at bbc.co.uk

1992 births
Living people
Batley Bulldogs players
Bradford Bulls players
Dewsbury Rams players
Doncaster R.L.F.C. players
English rugby league players
Rugby league centres
Rugby league players from Dewsbury
Wakefield Trinity players